Saqqez Darreh (also Romanized as Saqez Darreh; also known as Saqqez Darreh-ye Bālā and Qez Darreh) is a village in Abarshiveh Rural District, in the Central District of Damavand County, Tehran Province, Iran. At the 2006 census, its population was 37, in 12 families.

References 

Populated places in Damavand County